Anandagoundampalayam is a village located in Vennandur block.

References

Vennandur block